The International Center for Religion & Diplomacy is a non-profit organization located in Washington, DC. Its mission statement reads:  "The mission of ICRD is to address identity-based conflicts that exceed the reach of traditional diplomacy by incorporating religion as part of the solution."

The intellectual and spiritual basis for ICRD's unconventional approach to conflict resolution can be found in Religion, the Missing Dimension of Statecraft, Faith-based Diplomacy: Trumping Realpolitik (Oxford University Press, 1994 and 2003), and Religion, Terror, and Error: U.S. Foreign Policy and the Challenge of Spiritual Engagement. These books explore the positive role that religious or spiritual factors can play in preventing or resolving conflict, while advancing social change based on justice and reconciliation.  

Current projects include, Sudan, Kashmir, Pakistan, Iran, and Afghanistan.

Officers include:
 President:  Douglas Johnston                        
 Senior Vice President:  Brian Cox
 Vice President, Islamic Programs:  Abubaker al-Shingieti
 Treasurer:  Karen Roberts
 Counsel/Corporate Secretary: John Byington

References

External links
 International Center for Religion & Diplomacy website

Non-profit organizations based in Washington, D.C.
Year of establishment missing